Free is the fifth studio album by American singer Chico DeBarge. It was released by Alove Entertainment and Koch Records on March 5, 2003 in the United States. The album debuted and peaked at number 43 on the US Top Independent Albums chart, and produced the single "Home Alone." In 2017, the album was remastered and re-released as Free Remastered. It features six additional tracks such as DeBarge's contribution "Hard Times" from the Beauty Shop (2005) soundtrack.

Critical reception

AllMusic rated the album three and a half stars out of five. People magazine wrote: "Blending the lush romanticism of Maxwell with the hot-butter sexuality of D'Angelo, DeBarge creates the perfect soundtrack for a night of cuddling under the covers. Like many of today’s R&B Romeos, the singer [...] evokes Stevie Wonder and Marvin Gaye throughout this disc [...] Produced and almost entirely written by DeBarge, Free has a warm, personal vibe tailor-made for lovers.

Track listing

Personnel 
Credits adapted from the liner notes of Free.

Dexter Browne – photography
Gabe Chiesa – mixing engineer
Chico DeBarge – executive producer, producer
Michel Hand – engineer

Jean Marie Horvat – mixing engineer
Rob Reister – engineer, mixing engineer
Scooby – egnineer
Smurf – executive producer

Charts

Release history

References

Chico DeBarge albums
2003 albums